The Pakistan Armed Forces have been criticized for eroding democratic processes in Pakistan, for being the largest business conglomeration in the country and for excessive control over the domestic and foreign policies of Pakistan. Critics of the Pakistan Army, such as human rights activist Manzoor Pashteen, have been jailed while like-minded Pakistani citizens are warned against criticizing the military establishment. In Pakistan, the military is considered a part of what is known as The Establishment; they control the state through a backdoor and are a part of a working deep state.

Modus operandi: Reinforcing deep-state dominance

Control over economy: Military owned Pakistan's largest business conglomerations 
The Establishment's runs Pakistan's largest business conglomeration with more than 50 business entities worth over US$20 billion; owned through Army Welfare Trust, Bahria Foundation, Fauji Foundation and Shaheen Foundation; runs Pakistan's largest business empire ranging from petrol pumps to huge industrial plants, banks, bakeries, schools and universities, hosiery factories, milk dairies, stud farms, and cement plants, as well as 8 jewels in their crown Defence Housing Authority townships on prime lands across Pakistan in which awards military personnel farm lands and housing plots.

Control over government policy: Political Islam driven

The Establishment has control over the foreign, and domestic policy of Islamisation of Pakistan.

According to the historian Professor Mubarak Ali, textbook "reform" in Pakistan began with the introduction of Pakistan Studies and Islamic studies by Zulfiqar Ali Bhutto in 1971 into the national curriculum as a compulsory subject and the military dictator Muhammad Zia-ul-Haq, under a general drive towards Islamization, started the process of historical revisionism in earnest and exploited this initiative. 'The Pakistani establishment taught their children right from the beginning that this state was built on the basis of religion – that's why they don't have tolerance for other religions and want to wipe-out all of them.'

Implementation of policies
Core principles/values of the Establishment are the policy of treating India as an arch-rival and existential threat, the Kashmir obsession, Islamisation of Pakistan, Punjab as the heartland/core of Pakistan, strategic use of non-state militants and other Islamic states as Pakistan's natural allies.

Policy of homogenization of Pakistan

During the rule of General Muhammad Zia-ul-Haq a "program of Islamization" of the country including the textbooks was started to ingrain school kids with Islamised fundamentals.
 According to the Sustainable Development Policy Institute, since the 1970s Pakistan's school textbooks have systematically inculcated hatred towards India and Hindus through historical revisionism. These school books played a key role in spreading hatred against non-Muslims, particularly against Hindus and distorted the history. Professor Marwat blamed General Zia for “sowing seeds of discord in society on religious and ethnic lines by stuffing school curricula with material that promoted hatred now manifested in the shape of extremism, intolerance, militancy, sectarianism, dogmatism and fanaticism ... after the Indo-Pakistani War of 1965 countless lessons and chapters were introduced that spread hatred among the students and portrayed India as the biggest enemy of the Muslims. That stuff should be done away with." According to Tufts University professor Seyyed Vali Reza Nasr, Indophobia in Pakistan increased with the ascendancy of the militant Islamist Jamaat-e-Islami under Sayyid Abul Ala Maududi. Indophobia, together with Anti-Hinduism and racist ideologies, such as the martial race theory, were the driving factors behind the re-writing of school textbooks in Pakistan (in both "secular" schools and Islamic madrassahs) in order to promote a biased and revisionist historiography of the Indian subcontinent that promulgated Indophobic and anti-Hindu prejudices. These narratives are combined with Islamist propaganda in the extensive revising of Pakistan's history. By propagating concepts such as jihad, the inferiority of non-Muslims, India's perceived ingrained enmity with Pakistan, etc., the textbook board publications used by all government schools promote an obscurantist mindset.

Forced disappearances and targeted extra-judicial killings

The Establishment is allegedly responsible for the thousands of kidnapping and disappearances. and described as epidemic by Human Rights Watch (HRW), forced appearances, extrajudicial killings and targeted killings of people which the establishment consider enemy of the state. Through direct involvement of military and ISI in these activities. In July 2011, the Human Rights Commission of Pakistan issued a report on illegal disappearances in Balochistan which identified ISI and Frontier Corps as the perpetrators. The Establishment in Pakistan is responsible for the ongoing forced disappearance in Pakistan, a form of kidnapping, torturing and extrajudicial killing its own citizens without any judicial due process. After the US invasion of Afghanistan in 2001, forced disappearance in Pakistan began during the rule of military dictator General Pervez Musharraf (1999 to 2008). After Musharraf resigned in August 2008, he was charged with various human rights violations. During Musharraf's tenure, many people were forcibly taken away by government agencies.

Policy of Islamisation of Pakistan

Shariazation of Pakistan as "primary" policy of Pakistan was initiated and implemented by the government of military dictator General Muhammad Zia-ul-Haq, the ruler of Pakistan from 1977 until his death in 1988, who is "the person most responsible for turning Pakistan into a global center for political Islam".

Despite the partition of India, and resulting creation of Pakistan based on the concept of separate Islamic nation for the self determination of Muslims, Constitution of Pakistan has Islam as its state religion, teaching of quran and islamiyat is compulsory, Only Muslims can become Prime Minister or President of Pakistan and non-Muslims have not been raised to the highest level in the government recently. However, there remains a precedence of appointing non-Muslims to higher offices as well.

In the judiciary, Rana Bhagwandas and Alvin Robert Cornelius have served as former Chief Justices of Supreme Court.

In the government, Muhammad Zafarullah Khan served as Foreign Minister of Pakistan. Between 1961 and 1964, he was Pakistan's Permanent Representative at the United Nations. From 1962 to 1964, he was also the President of the UN General Assembly. He later rejoined the ICJ as a judge from 1964 to 1973, serving as President from 1970 to 1973.

In the military, General Akhtar Hussain Malik, overall commander for Operation Grand Slam in the Second Kashmir War is regarded as a war hero. His brother, Lieutenant General Abdul Ali Malik, has also served in the army as a 3-star general and commanded the I Corps during the third war with India in 1971. Major General Iftikhar Khan Janjua is the most senior Pakistani officer to have been killed in action and has held command of formations such as 6 Armoured Division, which has seen action in notable battles such as Battle of Mogadishu.

In Pakistan Air Force, non-Muslims have been promoted to the highest ranking position in the past. This is demonstrated by the promotion of Zafar Chaudhry, to the post of Chief of Air Staff. He has also served as managing director of the Pakistan International Airlines.

However, Ahmadis are constitutionally banned from calling themselves Muslims.

Constitutional and institutionalised persecution of minorities

 
The Establishment also engages in the institutionalised persecution of minorities in Pakistan, specially Ahmadiyya, Shias and Hazara after the Islamization of Pakistan by the military dictator General Muhammad Zia-ul-Haq who took over the power through military coup. Pakistan is known for widespread discrimination against religious minorities, with attacks against Christians, Hindus, Ahmadiyya, Shia, Sufi and Sikh communities being widespread. These attacks are usually blamed on religious extremists but certain laws in the Pakistan Criminal Code and government inaction have only caused these attacks to surge higher. Sunni militant groups operate with impunity across Pakistan, as law enforcement officials (The Establishment) either turn a blind eye or appear helpless to prevent widespread attacks against religious minorities. The rise of The Establishment in Pakistan-backed Taliban in Pakistan has been an influential and increasing factor in the persecution of and discrimination against religious minorities in Pakistan, such as Hindus, Christians, Sikhs, and other minorities.

Policy of obsession with Kashmir: Bleed India with a Thousand Cuts 

Bleed India with a Thousand Cuts is a military doctrine followed by Pakistani Establishment against India. It consists of waging covert war against India using insurgents at multiple locations.

According to scholar Aparna Pande, this view was put forward in various studies by the Pakistani military, particularly in its Staff College, Quetta. Peter Chalk and Christine Fair cite the former director of the Inter-Services Intelligence (ISI) explicating the strategy. This doctrine was first attempted to flame the Punjab insurgency and then Kashmir insurgency using India's western border with Pakistan.

In a 1965 speech to the UN Security Council, Zulfikar Ali Bhutto declared a thousand-year war against India. Pakistan Army Chief General Zia-ul-Haq gave form to Bhutto's "thousand years war" with the 'bleeding India through a thousand cuts' doctrine using covert and low-intensity warfare with militancy and infiltration.

Policy of state-sponsorship of terrorism
Ajmal Kasab, a Pakistani member of Pakistan-based globally banned terrorist organization by the United States, Lashkar-e-Taiba, which operates several terrorist training camps in Pakistan-administered Kashmir, launched 2008 Mumbai terrorist attacks killing 72 people.

Allegations: By multilateral organisations and other nations

The U.S. Country Reports on Terrorism describes Pakistan as a "Terrorist safe haven" where terrorists are able to organise, plan, raise funds, communicate, recruit, train, transit, and operate in relative security because of inadequate governance capacity, political will, or both. Pakistan's tribal region along its border with Afghanistan has been described as a safe haven for terrorists by western media and the United States Defense Secretary. In 2019, US issued series of official statements asking Pakistan to immediately end support and safe haven to all terrorist groups. A report by Saban Center for Middle East Policy at the Brookings Institution states that Pakistan was "the world's most active sponsor of terrorist groups... aiding these groups that pose a direct threat to the United States. Pakistan's active participation has caused thousands of deaths in the region; all these years Pakistan has been supportive to several terrorist groups despite several stern warnings from the international community." Pakistani government's top leaders and Pakistan Army's top leaders are often seen in public sharing stage with the UN and US designated terrorists.

Evidence of admissions 

In July 2019, former Prime Minister of Pakistan Imran Khan on his official visit to the United States admitted the presence of 30000-40000 armed terrorists in the country and that the previous governments were hiding this truth particularly from the US in the past. In 2018, former Pakistani prime minister Nawaz Sharif admitted that the Pakistani government played a role in the 2008 Mumbai attack. Former Pakistani president Pervez Musharraf, a military dictator who took over the power by military coup, conceded that his forces trained militant groups to fight India in Indian-administered Kashmir. He confessed that the government ″turned a blind eye″ because it wanted to force India to enter into negotiations, as well as raise the issue internationally. He also said Pakistani spies in the Inter-Services Intelligence directorate (ISI) cultivated the Taliban after 2001 because Karzai's government was dominated by non-Pashtuns, who are the country's largest ethnic group, and by officials who were thought to favour India.

See also 

 Military–industrial complex

References

Military of Pakistan
Civil–military relations
Criticism